Zwolle Half Marathon is an annual half marathon road running event held in Zwolle, Netherlands, in June. The race was first held in 2001 and attracts both amateur and professional runners. Over 3000 people took part in the 2008 edition of the race.

Jason Mbote of Kenya is a four-time winner of the race and his partner Flomena Chepchirchir has three victories on the women's side.

The course records were both set by Kenyans in 2011: Wilson Kipsang won the men's race in 60:49 minutes while Chepchirchir won her third title in a women's best of 1:08:22 hours.

Past winners
Key:

References

List of winners
Archive. Halve Marathon Zwolle. Retrieved on 2013-04-22.

External links
Official website

Half marathons in the Netherlands
2001 establishments in the Netherlands
Recurring sporting events established in 2001
Sports competitions in Zwolle